The Fleming River is a river of the eastern Catlins, New Zealand. A tributary of the Tautuku River, it rises west of Soaker Hill in the Maclennan Range and flows south-eastward through the Catlins Forest Park to join that river at Tautuku.

See also
List of rivers of New Zealand

References

Land Information New Zealand - Search for Place Names

Rivers of Otago
Rivers of New Zealand